Badcall comprises two remote hamlets, called Lower Badcall and Upper Badcall. Upper Badcall, a crofting township, is the larger of the two and is situated on the western shore of Badcall Bay. Lower Badcall is located less than 1 mile to the east on the eastern shore of Badcall Bay. Badcall is on the west coast of Sutherland, Scottish Highlands and is in the Scottish council area of Highland.

Badcall Bay is reached by the A894, the west coast route to the very north of Scotland.  The village of Scourie lies 2 miles northwest.

The bay is located in a remote area of outstanding natural beauty in a region designed as Scotland's first ‘Global Geopark’.

This beautiful region is studded with small islands and is home to The Eddrachilles Hotel and The Salmon House, HQ of Loch Duart Ltd, an independent salmon farm.  Badcall Bay Holiday Caravans – a small family-owned site is nearby, on the outskirts of Scourie.

The Badcall area offers a wide range of opportunities for walking, fishing, kayaking, climbing and hill walking throughout the area.

Gallery

References

Populated places in Sutherland